My Geisha is a 1962 American comedy film directed by Jack Cardiff, starring Shirley MacLaine, Yves Montand, Edward G. Robinson, and Bob Cummings and released by Paramount Pictures.
Written by Norman Krasna, based on Krasna's story of the same name, the film was produced and copyrighted in 1961 by MacLaine's then-husband Steve Parker. The world premiere was at the Plaza Theatre in London's West End on January 18, 1962.

Plot 
Paul Robaix, a famous director, wants to film the Puccini opera on location in Japan under the title Madame Butterfly, with the dialogue spoken in English and the score sung in Italian. His wife, Lucy Dell, has been the leading lady in all of his greatest films, and she is more famous. He feels that she overshadows him and he would like to achieve success independent of her. By choosing to film Madam Butterfly, he can select a different leading lady without hurting her feelings, because she, as a blue-eyed, red-headed comedy actress, would not be suitable to play a Japanese woman in a tragedy. As a surprise, she visits him in Japan while he's searching for a leading lady. To surprise him further, she disguises herself as a geisha at a dinner party, planning to unveil her identity during the meal.

But she is delighted to discover that everyone at the dinner party, including her husband, believes her to be a Japanese woman. When she learns that the studio has decided to only give her husband enough funds to film the movie in black and white because there are no big stars in the film, she decides that she will audition for the role of Butterfly, without telling her husband, but that the studio will know and therefore give him the budget he needs to make the film he wants.

She gets the part and is wonderful. Through the course of the film, Lucy Dell begins to become concerned that Yoko will steal her husband's affections, though he never does develop feelings for the invented character.

When viewing the film's negatives, with the colors reversed, he figures out her duplicity and, thinking she is doing it to steal credit from him so that once again he will not get the artistic praise he deserves, he becomes furious. To retaliate, he decides to proposition Yoko. Greatly distressed, she flees. Paul then entertains the idea of divorce for what he sees as him being betrayed by his wife.

Their "reunion" before the premiere is cold, Paul believing she will expose her identity there for betraying him, and Lucy believing that Paul was trying to sleep with Yoko. Her original plan was, at the end of the premiere, to reveal Yoko's true identity, which will astound Hollywood and practically guarantee her an Academy Award. Instead, her then trusted friend, Kazumi, gives her a present of a fan that was owned by a very popular geisha. The fan was inscribed with the saying: "No one before you, my husband, not even I." So, she takes off her geisha makeup, appears as herself, tells everyone that Yoko went into a convent and will no longer be performing, and keeps her identity secret. She and her husband reconcile when he informs Lucy that he knew she was Yoko.

Cast  

Shirley MacLaine as Lucy Dell
Yves Montand as Paul Robaix
Edward G. Robinson as Sam Lewis
Bob Cummings as Bob Moore
Yoko Tani as Kazumi Ito

Tatsuo Saito as Kenichi Takata
Tamae Kiyokawa as Amatsu Hisako
I. Hayakawa as Hisako
Alex Gerry as Leonard Lewis, Hollywood producer
Tsugundo Maki as Shiga

Vocals
Vocals for "Butterfly" by Michiko Sunahara
Vocals for "Lieutenant Pinkerton" by Barry Morell

Production
In June 1959, MacLaine signed to make the movie. In July 1959, Krasna signed to write the film.

In August 1960, it was announced the film would star MacLaine, James Stewart, Maria Callas, Gig Young, and Edward G. Robinson and be directed by Jack Cardiff.

Cummings was cast in December 1960.

Filming started in Japan 16 January 1961.

See also
Examples of yellowface

References

External links 

My Geisha at TV Guide (1987 write-up was originally published in The Motion Picture Guide)

1962 films
Films based on short fiction
Films directed by Jack Cardiff
1962 comedy films
Films scored by Franz Waxman
Films about geisha
Films about interracial romance
Paramount Pictures films
Films set in Los Angeles
Films set in Tokyo
Films set in Japan
Films shot in Japan
Japan in non-Japanese culture
1960s English-language films